Parapielus heimlichi is a moth of the family Hepialidae. It is found in Chile.

References

Moths described in 1956
Hepialidae
Endemic fauna of Chile